Barry Hamilton is an athlete and sports scientist from County Louth. He plays Gaelic football at inter-county level for Louth. His local club is Geraldines.

Hamilton featured at corner forward on the Louth side that played against a Dublin side featuring Ciarán Kilkenny in the 2012 Leinster final.

He is attending the 2014 FIFA World Cup as a member of the Croatia bench. The team are based in Salvador, Bahia.

See also
 List of players who have converted from one football code to another

References

Year of birth missing (living people)
Living people
Louth inter-county Gaelic footballers